Swindon Arts Centre is a 212-seat entertainment venue located in the Old Town area of Swindon, Wiltshire, England. It opened in 1956.

The Swindon Arts Centre is situated at the heart of Swindon's Old Town on Devizes Road. The venue hosts a varied programme of entertainment all year round made up of both professional and amateur productions.

Opening

The current Swindon Arts Centre was opened officially on Saturday 1 September 1956 by the mayor, N V Toze and Llewelyn Wyn Griffith, vice-chairman of the Arts Council of Great Britain. Prior to this date there had been an Arts Centre situated in the former Methodist Hall in the town centre, some ten years earlier.

Refurbishments

The Swindon Arts Centre reopened in January 2003 following its refurbishment. Improvements included the addition of a lift in the new entrance foyer to give easy access to the auditorium on the first floor, new accessible toilets and new seats in the auditorium.

In 2010 the venue underwent a major refurbishment. The ground floor was completely redesigned to create a new performance studio, bar & cafe and the refurbishment also made room for the Swindon Old Town public library to relocate in to the building.

Management

Theatre Manager - Clarry Bean (1994-2013)
Theatre Manager - Darren Edwards (2013-2015)
Theatre Manager - Elly Stimpson Duffy (2015 - Present)

In early 2015 Swindon Borough Council awarded the management contract to run Swindon Arts Centre to HQ Theatres & Hospitality who would run the venue in conjunction with the Wyvern Theatre.

Patron

In November 2010 television personality Richard Digance became the first Patron of the venue. Pam Ayres is the Patron of the Friends of Swindon Arts Centre.

See also 
 Swindon Art Gallery
 Swindon Festival of Literature

References

External links 
 Swindon Arts Centre

1956 establishments in England
Theatres in Wiltshire
Arts Centre
Arts centres in England